TVS is an architecture, planning, and interior design firm in Atlanta.

History
Founded in 1968 by Bill Thompson, Tom Ventulett, and Ray Stainback, tvsdesign has designed several notable buildings in greater Atlanta and beyond throughout the years, including the Omni Coliseum and Complex, the Georgia Dome, the AT&T Promenade buildings, the CNN Center, the Concourse at Landmark Center in Sandy Springs, the Georgia Aquarium, the Georgia World Congress Center buildings, and the to-be-completed Mercedes-Benz Stadium.

Also running offices in Chicago, Dubai and Shanghai, tvsdesign has designed several prominent buildings outside of Atlanta as well, including the Washington DC Convention Center, the Nanjing International Expo Center, the Pennsylvania Convention Center in Philadelphia, and the Vision Tower in Dubai.

In 2016, the firm named Janet Simpson its third president and first female president.

Notable projects

Awards 
 In 2002, Tvsdesign was awarded the Architecture Firm Award by the American Institute of Architects, which is given only once each year and recognizes the design work of an entire firm.
 Urban Land Institute 2012 Global Awards for Excellence for the Levine Center for the Arts in Charlotte, NC.

References 

Design companies established in 1968
Companies based in Atlanta
Architecture firms of the United States
1968 establishments in Georgia (U.S. state)